Anda Hendrawan (born January 25, 1984) is an Indonesian footballer who played for Persiram Raja Ampat in the Indonesia Super League.

Club statistics

References

1984 births
Association football defenders
Living people
Indonesian footballers
Liga 1 (Indonesia) players
Bontang F.C. players
Persiram Raja Ampat players
Semen Padang F.C. players
Sportspeople from Medan
21st-century Indonesian people